Antje Schmidt (born 1967) is a German actress. She appeared in more than sixty films since 1989.

Selected filmography

References

External links 

1967 births
Living people
German film actresses